Conasprella pacei is a species of sea snail, a marine gastropod mollusk in the family Conidae, the cone snails and their allies.

Like all species within the genus Conasprella, these cone snails are predatory and venomous. They are capable of "stinging" humans, therefore live ones should be handled carefully or not at all.

Description 
Original description: "Shell thin, fragile, delicate, elongated in shape; spire high, protracted; shoulder sharp-angled, smooth; protoconch large, 2 whorls; aperture narrow; body whorl ornamented with numerous incised spiral sulci,
giving  shell silky appearance; spire whorls ornamented with 3-4 thin, spiral threads; shell color pure white; interior of aperture white; periostracum thin, yellow, translucent."

The maximum recorded shell length is 20 mm.

Distribution
Locus typicus: "Southern coast of Grand Bahama Island, Bahamas."

This marine species occurs in deep water off the Bahamas.

Habitat 
Minimum recorded depth is 250 m. Maximum recorded depth is 250 m.

References

 Filmer R.M. (2001). A Catalogue of Nomenclature and Taxonomy in the Living Conidae 1758–1998. Backhuys Publishers, Leiden. 388pp
  Puillandre N., Duda T.F., Meyer C., Olivera B.M. & Bouchet P. (2015). One, four or 100 genera? A new classification of the cone snails. Journal of Molluscan Studies. 81: 1–23

External links
 The Conus Biodiversity website
 

pacei
Gastropods described in 1987